The Northern Territory general election  was held on Saturday 25 August 2012, which elected all 25 members of the Legislative Assembly in the unicameral Northern Territory Parliament. The 11-year Labor Party government led by Chief Minister Paul Henderson was defeated in their attempt to win a fourth term against the opposition Country Liberal Party led by opposition leader Terry Mills with a swing of four seats, losing the normally safe Labor remote seats of Arafura, Arnhem, Daly and Stuart, whilst retaining their urban seats picked up at the 2001 election.

Results

|}

Independents: Gerry Wood

Two safe Labor seats were uncontested at the previous election and therefore did not contribute to votes and results, all seats were contested at this election with the two previously uncontested Labor seats both won by the CLP.

Seats changing hands
Members in italics did not re-contest their Legislative Assembly seats at this election.

Background 
Historically, remote areas had voted Labor while the urban areas had voted CLP. The CLP had governed since the initial 1974 election until Labor led by Clare Martin surprisingly came to power with a one-seat majority government at the 2001 election, mainly by sweeping Darwin's more diverse northern suburbs. Labor won in a landslide at the 2005 election, winning the second-largest majority in the Territory's history and reducing the CLP to only four seats. Although Labor led by Henderson retained a one-seat majority government at the 2008 election on 13 Labor, 11 CLP, 1 independent with only 49.3 percent of the two-party preferred vote, Labor had won two seats uncontested by the CLP—all seats were contested again at the 2012 election. Labor, the CLP, the Northern Territory Greens, the First Nations Political Party and the Australian Sex Party were running endorsed candidates.

A minority government was led by Henderson from mid-2009 when Alison Anderson resigned from the Labor Party to sit as an independent member of parliament. Anderson along with the existing independent Gerry Wood signed a letter to the speaker of parliament to push sittings forward, prompting CLP leader Mills to table a motion of no confidence on Monday 10 August 2009. Wood ended up voting with the government, defeating the motion of no confidence. Anderson joined the CLP in September 2011, resulting in 12 Labor, 12 CLP, 1 independent. Wood and Anderson retained their seats at the 2012 election.

In October 2010, former CLP leader Jodeen Carney resigned in her seat, an Araluen by-election was held, the CLP retained the seat but suffered a 6.6-point two-party preferred swing.

Method 
Like the Australian House of Representatives, members were elected through full-preference instant-runoff voting in single-member electorates. The election was conducted by the Northern Territory Electoral Commission, an independent body answerable to Parliament.

In a change to polling in remote electorates, where most voting was previously conducted by mobile polling teams, for the first time there was full election day voting in major regional indigenous centres. As such, swings may be distorted. The conducting of a formal polling place could also alter the way voting takes places and increase the local turnout. Mobile polling teams were still used but they took many fewer votes than in the past. In addition, for the first time in the territory, there was an electronic feed of results, the last administration in Australia to go electronic.

Date 
The Henderson Labor government introduced fixed four-year terms following the previous election.

The Legislative Assembly was dissolved on 6 August 2012. The electoral roll was closed on 8 August and nominations on 10 August, prior to polling day on 25 August.

The election was held on the same day as the Heffron state by-election in New South Wales.

Retiring MPs

Labor 
 Jane Aagaard (Nightcliff)
 Chris Burns (Johnston)
 Marion Scrymgour (Arafura)

Candidates 

Sitting members are listed in bold. Successful candidates are highlighted in the relevant colour.

Unregistered parties and groups 
 Two previous One Nation candidates ran, One Nation Northern Territory Branch President John Kearney in Goyder and Peter Bussa from NSW in Johnston.

Electoral pendulum 
The following pendulum is known as the Mackerras pendulum, invented by psephologist Malcolm Mackerras. The pendulum works by lining up all of the seats held in the Legislative Assembly according to the percentage point margin they are held by on a two-party-preferred basis. This is also known as the swing required for the seat to change hands. Given a uniform swing to the opposition or government parties, the number of seats that change hands can be predicted. Results are notional calculations of the redistribution.

Pre-election pendulum 
Members listed in italics did not re-contest their seat at the election.

Post-election pendulum

Newspaper endorsements

References

External links 
 Northern Territory Electoral Commission

Elections in the Northern Territory
2012 elections in Australia
2010s in the Northern Territory
August 2012 events in Australia